Agnieszka Anna Gąsienica-Daniel (born 22 December 1987) is a female skier from Poland. She took part in the Alpine skiing events at the 2010 Winter Olympics, and at the FIS Alpine World Ski Championships in 2007. She is the sister of fellow alpine skier Maryna Gąsienica-Daniel.

Results
FIS Alpine World Ski Championships 2007: Women's Slalom–DNFLadies Giant Slalom–DNF2010 Winter Olympics:Women's Downhill– 32Women's Super Combined– 29Women's Super-G– 23Women's Slalom– 46 & 35Women's Giant Slalom– DNF

References

External links
 Agnieszka Gasienica Daniel at www.vancouver2010.com

1987 births
Living people
Alpine skiers at the 2010 Winter Olympics
Polish female alpine skiers
Olympic alpine skiers of Poland
Sportspeople from Zakopane
21st-century Polish women